Mohammad Yusef the Painter was a Safavid era Persian painter of the Isfahan school. He was an apprentice of Reza Abbasi. The Shahnameh of Rashida is attributed to him. It seems that he and Mohammad Qasem were close co-workers, as their names are usually mentioned together. The Windsor Shahnameh (also known as the Shahnameh of Qarachaqay Khan) contains 148 or 149 miniatures, all of them are attributed to Mohammad Yusef and Mohammad Qasem, except the first two miniatures. The miniatures of this Shahnameh are very similar to the miniatures of the Shahnameh of Rashida, and therefore it has been suggested that these manuscripts of Shahnameh have been prepared by same painters.

Miniatures

References 

 Persian Wikipedia

Persian miniature painters
17th-century Iranian painters
Artists from Isfahan
17th-century painters of Safavid Iran